Last Survivors (formerly titled SHTF) is a 2021 American thriller film directed by Drew Mylrea and starring Drew Van Acker, Alicia Silverstone and Stephen Moyer. It takes place in a post-apocalyptic world where for the past twenty years Troy (Stephen Moyer) has raised his now grown son, Jake (Drew Van Acker), in isolation in the woods miles away from any remnants of civilization.

Plot
Troy and his son Jake have been living off the grid for over twenty years in the wake of an apocalyptic event that destroyed much of civilization and left the survivors desperate. Troy has constantly drilled Jake on the necessity of assuming any outsider is a clear and immediate danger that must be eliminated; he kills and buries anyone who happens upon them. One day an outsider shoots Troy, and Jake must leave to bring back antibiotics. He sees a woman working outside a house, but can't bring himself to kill her as his father instructed he do with anyone he encountered. He sneaks into her house to find antibiotics and steroids and returns home.  

Jake hides some food to make his father think they have less than they do so he has an excuse to go hunting, and he returns to the woman's home and confronts her; she tells him her name is Henrietta. As they talk it becomes obvious to the viewer that there has been no generalized apocalyptic event. 

Troy becomes suspicious of Jake, and Jake starts to doubt Troy's accounts of the state of the outside world.

Cast
 Drew Van Acker as Jake 
 Alicia Silverstone as Henrietta 
 Stephen Moyer as Troy

Production
Principal photography occurred in Butte, Montana and wrapped in January 2021.

Reception
The film has a 73% rating on Rotten Tomatoes based on fifteen reviews.

Nadir Samara of Screen Rant awarded the film two and a half stars out of five.  Martin Unsworth of Starburst awarded the film three stars.

Angie Han of The Hollywood Reporter gave the film a negative review and wrote, "it’s clearly a film with a lot on its mind, one that’s eager to grapple with the gnarled roots of its own appeal. But its reticence keeps it from exploring the more challenging, and possibly more rewarding, paths laid out before it."

References

External links
 
 
 

2021 films
American science fiction thriller films
Films shot in Montana
2021 science fiction films
2020s English-language films
2020s American films